Agladrillia benjamini is a species of sea snail, a marine gastropod mollusk in the family Drilliidae.

Description
The length of the species attains 15.3 mm, its diameter 5.7 mm.

(Original description) The elongate-conic shell is flesh colored. The protoconch contains more than one, smooth whorl. The whorls of the teleoconch are strongly rounded. The sinus falls at the summit where the whorls are somewhat contracted. The surface of the whorls of the teleoconch are marked with strong, rounded, protracted axial ribs, which begin practically anterior to the sinus and extend strongly to the periphery. They are scarcely defined anterior to this on the body whorl. Of these ribs 10 occur upon the first to fourth, 12 upon the fifth to seventh, and 14 upon the penultimate whorl. The axial ribs are about as wide as the spaces that separate them. In addition to these axial ribs the whorls are marked by numerous slender spiral threads, of which about 5 occur in the area of the sinus on the last three turns. These are finer than those that cover the rest of the turn between the sutures. Of the latter, three occur on the first to third, four on the fourth, seven on the fifth and sixth, eleven on the next, and thirteen on the last turn. The spaces between the spiral threads about equal the spiral threads in strength. The surface between the spiral threads is covered with fine granulations on the spire. The last whorl anterior to the periphery is marked by 27 spiral cords, which are about equal and equally spaced, being only a trifle stronger on the columella. The sutures are well constricted. The aperture shows a strong deep sinus at its posterior angle, which renders the outer lip, anterior to this, decidedly claw-like. The outer lip is strongly re-enforced within by a callus that bears about 15 denticulations on the inner surface. The columella and the parietal wall are glazed with a thin callus.

Distribution
This marine species occurs off South Africa.

References

External links
 P. Bartsch (1915), Report on the Turton collection of South African marine mollusks, with additional notes on other South African shells contained in the United States National Museum; Bulletin of the United States National Museum v. 91 (1915)

benjamini
Gastropods described in 1915